The Signalberg is, at , the highest elevation in the Damme Hills and Oldenburg Münsterland. It rises in the district of Vechta in the north German state of Lower Saxony. The name means "beacon hill".

References 

Hills of Lower Saxony
Vechta (district)